Mount Whitcombe is a large mountain, 1,425 m, standing just north of Mount Perseverance and west of Mount Arrowsmith at the west side of Evans Piedmont Glacier in Victoria Land. Mapped in 1957 by the New Zealand Northern Survey Party of the Commonwealth Trans-Antarctic Expedition, 1956–58. Named by them for its similarity to the Canterbury, New Zealand, mountain of that name, and in association with Mount Arrowsmith.

Mountains of Victoria Land
Scott Coast